Brian J Barnes (born 2 March 1934) is a male British former swimmer. Barnes competed in the men's 200 metre breaststroke at the 1952 Summer Olympics. At the ASA National British Championships he won the 220 yards butterfly title in 1953.

References

1934 births
Living people
British male swimmers
Olympic swimmers of Great Britain
Swimmers at the 1952 Summer Olympics
Sportspeople from Preston, Lancashire
British male breaststroke swimmers
20th-century British people
21st-century British people